The Indian Journal of Cancer is a peer-reviewed open-access medical journal published by Medknow Publications on behalf of the Indian Cancer Society, Indian Cooperative Oncology Network and Indian Society of Oncology. The journal is the oldest oncology journal from India and covers all aspects of oncology, including medical oncology, surgical oncology, radiation oncology, oncopathology, preventive oncology, public health. The journal is abstracted and indexed in PubMed and the Science Citation Index Expanded. It is brought out quarterly.

External links 
 

Open access journals
Quarterly journals
English-language journals
Oncology journals
Medknow Publications academic journals
Publications established in 1964
Cancer in India
Academic journals associated with learned and professional societies of India